Thomas Bradford Curtis (May 14, 1911 – January 10, 1993) was an American Republican politician from Missouri who represented suburban St. Louis County, Missouri for nine terms from 1951 to 1969. He was a primary driver behind the Civil Rights Act of 1964 and aggressive supporter of civil rights for black Americans throughout his career.

Early life and education
Born in St. Louis, Missouri, Curtis attended the public schools of Webster Groves, Missouri. He attended Dartmouth College in Hanover, New Hampshire where he was a member of Phi Sigma Kappa, earning an A.B. in 1932. He was admitted to the bar in 1934 and commenced the practice of law in St. Louis. He received an LL.B. degree from the School of Law at Washington University in St. Louis in 1935.  He received an M.A. from Dartmouth in 1951, and a J.D. from Westminster College in 1964.

Political career
He served as member of the Board of Election Commissioners of St. Louis County in 1942. He served in the United States Navy from April 8, 1942, until discharged as a lieutenant commander December 21, 1945. He served as member of the Missouri State Board of Law Examiners in 1947–1950.

U.S. Representative
Curtis was elected as a Republican to the Eighty-second and to the eight succeeding Congresses (January 3, 1951 – January 3, 1969).

The Civil Rights Act of 1964 originated in Curtis' office in 1962, and it was mainly Republican pressure from Curtis and his fellow Republican Judiciary Committee member William McCulloch of Ohio that forced John F. Kennedy to make his first, hesitant message on civil rights in April 1963.  Curtis' defense of civil rights was rooted partly in the Lincoln tradition of the GOP, but more simply in the belief that civil rights were at the base of the American philosophy of government and Judeo-Christian morality and that their defense was "the most fundamental issue that confronts any government at any time," as he wrote in 1952.

Curtis did not sign the 1956 Southern Manifesto, and voted in favor of the Civil Rights Acts of 1957, 1960, 1964, and 1968, and the Voting Rights Act of 1965, but voted against the 24th Amendment to the U.S. Constitution.

He was not a candidate for reelection in 1968 to the House of Representatives but was an unsuccessful candidate for election to the United States Senate, losing to Democrat Thomas Eagleton by a 51% to 49% margin.

Curtis was a noted economist, considered by most Republicans and some Democrats to be the most knowledgeable and insightful economist in Washington during his tenure as a Member of Congress.

After Congress
He served as delegate to the Republican National Convention, 1964, 1976 and 1980. He served as vice president and general counsel, Encyclopædia Britannica, from 1969 to 1973. He was an unsuccessful candidate for the United States Senate again in 1974, winning only 39% of the vote against incumbent Thomas Eagleton. He served as chairman of the Corporation for Public Broadcasting from 1972 to 1973. He served as chairman of the Federal Election Commission from April 1975 to May 1976. He was a consultant for the National Association of Technical and Trade Schools.

Death
Curtis was a resident of Pier Cove, Michigan, until his death in Allegan, Michigan, on January 10, 1993.

References

1911 births
1993 deaths
20th-century American politicians
United States Navy personnel of World War II
American Unitarians
Corporation for Public Broadcasting
County commissioners in Missouri
Dartmouth College alumni
Encyclopædia Britannica
Members of the Federal Election Commission
Missouri lawyers
People from Allegan County, Michigan
Politicians from St. Louis County, Missouri
Republican Party members of the United States House of Representatives from Missouri
United States Navy officers
Washington University School of Law alumni
Westminster College (Missouri) alumni
Ford administration personnel